The Republican Alliance of Social Forces is an electoral alliance in Egypt that will compete in the 2015 Egyptian parliamentary election. Some candidates from this list as well as the Reawakening of Egypt list have withdrawn from their own lists and joined the Egypt list.

References

Political party alliances in Egypt